Steiger is a tractor brand that is manufactured in the United States. The Steiger Tractor Company was founded in the 1950s by Douglass Steiger and Maurice Steiger, brothers who were farmers near Red Lake Falls, Minnesota. The Steigers first built a tractor in their workshop for their own use out of truck components, before beginning broader manufacturing and marketing of tractors in the United States and Canada. The tractor brand was acquired by Case IH in 1986, who continued production of tractor models under the name Steiger.

History

 
The tractor division of Steiger Farms was moved to Fargo, North Dakota, in 1969. It was acquired by Case IH in 1986, which later became part of Italy's FIAT Group.

Under CEO Eugene Dahl (formerly VP of Purchasing for the Melroe Company of Gwinner, ND) they have been one of the few successful mass-producers of 4WD tractors in the world.  In the 1970s, International Harvester company of Chicago purchased a 30% stake in the company.  This stake was later sold to Deutz-Fahr of Germany in 1982.

Case IH, formed from the merger of Tenneco's Case with the agricultural arm of International Harvester, purchased Steiger in 1986, and the familiar lime-green color of Steiger's was retired as CIH's red took over.  The Steiger name disappeared for a while, but was re-introduced on the 4WD tractors in Case IH's stable as their flagship line, they can also be purchased as a New Holland. The 2009 models are branded as Case STX Steiger and are offered in power rating from 200 hp to 500+ hp, with a Quadtrac option on most models in the lineup.

Steiger has built tractors for other tractor manufacturers and distributors under the International Harvester and Co-op Implements brand, such as, Ford and Allis-Chalmers.

Steiger licensed their tractor designs to RÁBA of Hungary, which built RÁBA and RÁBA-Steiger tractors.  Vandel, of France, also licensed the Steiger design and built tractors under their name.

Former Steiger President Jack Johnson later formed Titan Tractors in Fargo to re-manufacture and retrofit old Steigers.

American Tractors, or AmTrac, in England, retrofits and rebuilds old Steigers.

Models 

 AFS Connect Steiger Series Years of Production: 2020-Current
 Steiger Series Years of Production: 2008-2020
 Steiger STX Series Years of Production: 2000-2008
 9300 Series Years of Production: 1996-1999
 9200 Series Years of Production: 1990-1995
 9100 Series  Years of Production: 1986-1989
 1000 Series Years of Production: 1983-1986
 Series IV Years of Production: 1983-1985 (The Tiger IV was produced from 1984–1988 and ended production as the Case International 9190)
 Industrial Series Years of Production: 1982-1984
 Ford FW Series Years of Production: FW Series 1978-1982
 Series III PT/PTA Years of Production: PT Series 1977-1981/PTA Series 1978-1982
 Series III Years of Production: 1976-1983
 Series II Years of Production: 1974-1976
 Series I Years of Production: 1969-1974
 Barn Series Years of Production: 1963-1969

References 

Red 4WD Tractors: High-Horsepower 4WD Tractors from IH, Steiger, Case IH and J.I.Case

External links

Case IH
Steiger at TractorData.com

CNH Industrial
Tractor manufacturers of the United States
Agriculture companies of the United States
Thief River Falls, Minnesota